Talbert D. Jessuppe (February 3, 1899 – December 28, 1965) was an American football  and basketball coach. He served as the head football coach at Northern Arizona State Teacher's College—now known as Northern Arizona University—in 1925, compiling a record of 2–3–1. Jessuppe was also school's head basketball coach in 1925–26, tallying a mark of 5–8.

Head coaching record

College football

References

External links
 

1899 births
1965 deaths
Basketball coaches from Indiana
Northern Arizona Lumberjacks football coaches
Northern Arizona Lumberjacks men's basketball coaches
High school football coaches in Indiana
Sportspeople from Richmond, Indiana